Ernst Hofer (born 17 December 1902, date of death unknown) was a Swiss racing cyclist. He rode in the 1932 Tour de France.

References

1902 births
Year of death missing
Swiss male cyclists
Place of birth missing